Yevhen Serhiyovych Deidei (12 July 1987 – disappeared 10 March 2022) is a Ukrainian politician and coordinator of the battalion of the Special Tasks Patrol Police "Kyiv-1" of the Main Directorate of the Ministry of Internal Affairs of Ukraine in Kyiv.

He was a people's deputy of Ukraine from November 2014 until August 2019. In 2012, he was sentenced to five years in prison for robbery but was later released from the punishment.

Deidei's current whereabouts are unknown. Initial reports indicated that he was killed during the 2022 Russian invasion of Ukraine, but other sources have subsequently claimed that he clandestinely left the country via smuggling routes.

Biography

Early years
Deidei was born on 12 July 1987 in the small town of Reni, Odessa Oblast, which lies on the left bank of the Danube. His father, a deputy of the town council of Reni, Serhiy Yakovych Deidei, in 2011 he was convicted of fraud by the decision of Izmailsky District Court of Odessa Oblast. His mother - Olʹha Mykolayivna Deidei (née Volkova), he has a brother Serhiy.

In 2004, at the age of 17, he participated in protests during the "Orange Revolution" in Ukraine.

Deidei was convicted of robbery in 2012. The verdict was pronounced by the Suvorov district court of Odessa on 23 March 2012. Deidei received five years for robbery without confiscation of property. His accomplice Oleksiy Lyakhovolʹskiy (later he became his assistant in Verkhovna Rada) received the same term of imprisonment - 5 years without confiscation of property. According to the court decision, Deidei acquired a hunting shotgun "TOZ" without any permit, later he sawed off the shoulder stock and barrel of the shotgun, which he kept with him without any legal rights. On 2 February 2011, Deidei and Lyakhovolʹskiy made the first robbery attack on A. Trandasir and S. Trandasir on the 1st Student Lane in Odessa. They beat citizens and took their mobile phone and money. In the evening of the same day, Deidei and Lyakhovolʹskiy attacked two men, A. Khmuryy and I. Sakal, at the corner of Krasnoslobodskaya Street and Yasha Gordienko Street. On the night of 3 February, near the house No. 3 along Ostrovsky Street, the criminals committed the third attack - on S. Syvoplyasov, D. Shevchuk and V. Rudkovsʹka. Accomplices began to beat the men, when they were noticed by militsiya officers. Lyakhovolʹskiy was arrested while trying to escape from the crime scene. On 11 February, after the opening of the criminal case, Deidei was also arrested.

Deidei and Lyakhovolʹskiy fully admitted their guilt in the above explained crimes. On 23 March 2012, Suvorov District Court of Odessa sentenced Deidei and Lyakhovolʹskiy for robbery to five years in prison without confiscating of property (with a delay of three years). According to the decision of the Liubashivka District Court of the Odessa Oblast of 6 April 2015, Lyakhovolʹskiy was released from the punishment. From the end of 2013, Deidei began to hide from the authorities, but was not wanted. After the beginning of the protests in Ukraine, Deidei became the Sotnik of the 7th Sotnia of “Self-Defense of the Maidan”.

War in Donbas
In 2014, Deidei became the coordinator of the battalion of the Special Tasks Patrol Police "Kyiv-1" of the Main Directorate of the Ministry of Internal Affairs of Ukraine in Kyiv. In November 2014, he became a people's deputy of the 8th convocation of the Verkhovna Rada on the list of the "People's Front" party.

In the same year, Deidei became the coordinator of the battalion of the Special Tasks Patrol Police "Kyiv-1" of the Main Directorate of the Ministry of Internal Affairs of Ukraine in Kyiv. On 10 September 2014, along with other commanders of volunteer battalions he was included in the Council of war of Ukraine during the congress of the party "People's Front".

On 24 February 2015, the car in which Deidei was driving was shot from an RPG-7 rocket-propelled grenade launcher. This incident occurred in the area of Marinka, Donetsk Oblast. Deidei managed to escape from the scene of the shelling, along with two soldiers of the "Kyiv-1" battalion, and get to the Kurakhove district department.

On 14 July 2017, Deidei received a shrapnel wound of a foot with an 82-mm shell in Avdiivka. This was reported by his comrade-in-arms in the "Kyiv-1" battalion. The Prosecutor's Office of Ukraine opened criminal proceedings. According to Ukrainian journalists, at the time when Deidei was in Avdiivka, there was not recorded any heavy shelling.

Political life
During Euromaidan, Deidei met a number of politicians who occupied or subsequently occupied high posts in the Ukrainian authorities - Arseniy Yatsenyuk, Arsen Avakov, and Oleksandr Turchynov. Deidei spoke about his decision to become a parliamentarian as follows: "I decided to go to the Verkhovna Rada because I saw people there [in Maidan Nezalezhnosti] who were different from those politicians who were there before us. [Previous politicians] did nothing, but robbery and theft. And I saw a perspective in these people, so I decided to follow them."

On 6 February 2015, a number of media published photos of correspondence between the deputy of the "People's Front" Oleksandr Kodola and Deidei. The latter promised $1,500 for Kodola for "asking a question" to the Prosecutor General of Ukraine, Vitaly Yarema, during his speech at the Verkhovna Rada. Kodola asked Yarema about the former First deputy prosecutor of the Pecherskyi District of Kyiv and, at that time, the Prosecutor of the Prymorsky City District of Odessa, Oleksandr Kuz'menko, who opposed the Euromaidan activists.

According to police sources, in 2015, Deidei together with his wife Inga flew four times on a private charter plane AHO633J of Denys Dzenzersʹkyy, whose assistant Ihor Linchevsʹkyy loaned Inga Deidei UAH 3.5 million. Together with them, deputies Tetyana Donetsʹ and Andriy Pavelko flew to Berlin and returned to Kyiv from Paris, Cannes, and Budapest. During those flights, Deidei and Dzenzersʹkyy used diplomatic passports, which is strictly prohibited, since the purpose of their trip was leisure.

In March 2016, the head of the largest Ukrainian gas producer UkrGasVydobuvannya Oleh Prokhorenko appealed to the National Anti-Corruption Bureau, the Prosecutor General's Office, and the National Police to investigate the activities of deputies Maxym Polyakov and Deidei, who, according to Prokhorenko, was putting pressure on the company. Deidei protested against the appointment of Andrey Tokar to the post of Director of logistics of UkrGasVydobuvannya due to the fact that he previously worked at the Saratov Oil Refinery in Russia: "How can such a strategic object as UkrGasVydobuvannya be under the leadership of Putin's lapdogs?! It can't be allowed to happen," - Deidei wrote on his Facebook page on 3 March 2016. Deidei also participated in a protest action close to the UkrGasVydobuvannya's Office, and he gave to the company management a letter demanding to dismiss Tokar. UkrGasVydobuvannya's COO Oleksandr Romanyuk noted that such a position of the deputy frightens away foreign workers who speak Russian or English and have experience that Ukrainian citizens don't have.

In July 2016, the Governor of Odessa Oblast and the third President of Georgia, Mikheil Saakashvili, accused Deidei of blocking the attraction of Latvian investments in the port of Reni on behalf of Arsen Avakov. Saakashvili also expressed outrage at Deidei's criminal past: "A Latvian investor could invest €6 million in the Reni port, several hundred Renians could get a job. This is a depressive port. But deputy Deidei, who was convicted four times, calls me and on behalf of the Ministry of Internal Affairs, says that the Latvians should not be allowed. What does the MIA have to do with the port of Reni? And why a four times convicted person is sitting in the parliament and allowing himself to call and discussing such topics with me?"

In May 2017, the Prosecutor General of Ukraine, Yuriy Lutsenko, sent to the Verkhovna Rada a request for the removal of parliamentary immunity from Deidei. He was suspected of violating Article 368-2 of the Criminal Code of Ukraine ("illegal enrichment"). On 3 July, Lutsenko, during a meeting of the Rada's Regulatory Committee, showed recordings of telephone conversations about Inga Deidei's loan of UAH 3.5 million from businessman Ihor Linchevsʹkyy. These records do not confirm the origin of the money through the loan. The materials of the Prosecutor's Office, sent in July 2017 to the Verkhovna Rada, stated the following:
 According to the State Fiscal Service of Ukraine, from 1 June 2009 to 31 December 2016 Deidei received a total income of UAH 241,883.3.
 His ex-wife Inga Deidei from 14 September 2007 to 31 December 2016 received a total income of UAH 1,198,822.5.
 Total income of the Deidei family was UAH 1,440,705.84.
 In the declaration of Yevhen Deidei, it was stated that Inga had financial obligations to Ihor Linchevsʹkyy in the amount of UAH 3.5 million.
 During the pre-trial investigation, it was established that the loan agreement between Inga Deidei and Ihor Linchevsʹkyy was not executed, and the money was not transferred.
 With a total income of UAH 1,440,705.84, Deidei officially indicated assets of UAH 6,133,690.95 - an apartment in Kyiv worth UAH 2,893,993.06, two Audi Q7 cars (worth UAH 1,574,818.67 and UAH 1,664,879.22).

On 1 November 2018, Deidei was included in the Russian sanctions list in connection with Ukraine's unfriendly actions towards citizens and legal entities of the Russian Federation.

Awards
Order For Courage, 3rd class (2 August 2014). On 19 September 2018, a message appeared in the official government newspaper Uryadovy Kuryer, in which the Order For Courage (together with the order book) received by Deidei was declared lost.
Honorary weapon – Glock-17 pistol (11 March 2015).
 25 Years of Independence of Ukraine Medal (19 August 2016).

Earnings
In 2013, Deidei did not declare any income. He owned a 15-year-old Toyota Corolla, and his wife Inga had a five-year-old Subaru Tribeca. In 2014, Inga Deidei, who earned UAH 14,500 (USD 539) in a year, acquired a 2013 Chevrolet Camaro. The Camaro was sold next year for UAH 700,000, and two Audi Q7 were bought for a total of UAH 3.5 million. According to the declaration, the money came from a loan given to Inga.

In 2015, Deidei declared expenses in the amount of UAH 2,737 million for the construction of an apartment – without specifying the source of this money. In this regard, National Anti-Corruption Bureau opened criminal proceedings under article No. 368-2 of the Criminal Code of Ukraine ("Illegal enrichment"). At the end of 2015, Deidei declared US$30,000 in cash, and his former spouse – USD 41,000 and UAH 350,000. At the same time, the deputy's salary for 2015 was UAH 70,600, he also received UAH 80,500 as compensation for the exercise of powers, as well as UAH 180,000 as compensation for rental housing, while Inga Deidei earned UAH 39,000.

According to an investigation of independent journalist Volodymyr Boyko, Deidei owned a luxury car park, consisting of Infiniti FX35 (2009), Chevrolet Camaro (2012), Audi A7 (2011), Toyota Land Cruiser 200 (2013), Porsche Cayenne (2011), as well as the two above-mentioned Audi Q7 (2015).

Alleged death 
On March 10, 2022, Deidei's wife announced his death, though she did not specify the circumstances. She later clarified that she had been informed of her husband's death, but did not specify by whom. Several sources from the Ukrainian border service and police have claimed that Deidei is in fact alive and illegally left the country into Romania via smuggling routes, and that a man who assisted him has been detained.

References

External links
 People's Front profile 

1987 births
2022 deaths
Eighth convocation members of the Verkhovna Rada
Ukrainian military personnel killed in the 2022 Russian invasion of Ukraine
Odesa Law Academy alumni
Outlaws
People from Odesa Oblast
People of the Euromaidan
Recipients of the Order For Courage, 3rd class
21st-century Ukrainian politicians